Nora Noffke is an American geologist who is a professor in the Department of Ocean and Earth Sciences, Old Dominion University in Norfolk, Virginia, USA. Noffke's research focuses on the sedimentology of biofilm forming sedimentary structures in modern aquatic environments, where clastic deposits dominate. Such structures occur in the fossil record as well. Her studies are interdisciplinary combining sedimentology with microbiology, geochemistry, and mineralogy.

Early life 
Noffke's interest in fossils originated from her early years when she would spend time hiking with her parents on the Schwaebische Alb, a mountain chain in Germany.  The area was rich in fossils, paving the way for her lifelong career in the field of paleontology and geology.

Education 
Noffke received a Bachelor of Science and a Master of Sciences (Diploma) in geology-paleontology from the University of Tübingen, Germany. Her diploma thesis advisor was Dolf Seilacher. Together they carried out research on trace fossils including Daedalus halli from the Lower Arenigian, Montagne Noire, France. Noffke did her Ph.D. in Geomicrobiology at the University of Oldenburg, Germany where she worked alongside Gisela Gerdes, a microbiologist who conducted research in the field of modern microbial mats in siliciclastic deposits. In 2000, Noffke migrated to the US, where she was a postdoctoral researcher at the Department of Organismic Biology and Evolution, at Harvard University, as a guest of Andy Knoll. Shortly thereafter, she became professor for sedimentology at the Department of Ocean and Earth Sciences at Old Dominion University, Norfolk, Virginia.

Career and research
Noffke is known for her work on microbial mats causing microbially induced sedimentary structures (MISS) in sandy deposits. Her work employs the actuopaleontological approach in the examination of the Earth's past. MISS allow insight into past prokaryote and single-celled benthos, and the paleoenvironment and paleoclimate. Noffke discovered 17 different types of MISS that result from microbial growth and EPS-production, trapping, biostabilization, baffling, and binding. The Dresser Formation, Pilbara, Western Australia, includes some of the oldest MISS. The fossil microbial mats covered clastic tidal flats, channels and pools. MISS at Dinosaur Ridge, added knowledge on paleoenvironmental conditions under which the Upper Crustaceous "J" Sandstone formed, and broadened insight of track sites development.

In collaboration with Gerdes, Thomas Klenke, and Wolfgang E. Krumbein, Noffke suggested a new, fifth group to Pettijohn and Potter's classification of primary sedimentary structures. They called the group bedding modified by microbial mats and biofilms, and divided it into two classes: one for those on bedding planes, and the second for those within beds. The first class includes microbial wrinkle structures, mat/sand chips, erosional remnants and pockets, palimpsest/multidirectional ripple marks, shrinkage cracks and mat curls. The second class, within beds, includes biolaminites,  gas domes, sponge pore fabrics and fenestrae structures, as well as "microbially induced sedimentary textures (MIST) such as oriented grains, sinoidal laminae, and mat-layer-bound grain sizes.

Noffke's work on microbially induced sedimentary structures (MISS) in sandy deposits is summarized in a textbook. The book describes MISS as biosignatures valuable for the exploration extraterrestrial life.

Noffke is Acting Chair of the Subcommission on Precambrian Stratigraphy of the International Stratigraphic Commission, and is the editor for the volume Prokaryota of the Treatise of Invertebrate Paleontology. Noffke has organized the SEPM Field Conference on Siliciclastic Microbial Mats 2010, and together with John Stolz has established the Gordon Research Conference: Geobiology. She was one of the early chairs of the Division for Geobiology and Geomicrobiology of the Geological Society of America (GSA).

In honor of Noffke's service to the science community, a 550 million year old fossil group from the Ediacaran Grant Bluff Formation, Australia, was named after her: Noffkarkys storaaslii ('net of Noffke')

Since 2014, her work has moved away from Ediacaran fossils to work on microbial mats along the coast in Australia. Her work indulges in the study of changes to the shoreline and traces left in the sand. Nora believes microbial mats have been consistent throughout earth's history dating back to 3.94 million years ago. Now, she believes there are signs of microbial mat traces on other planets.

Noffke has spent a decade generating and gathering sedimentary evidence of prokaryote biofilms on earth. Now she has shifted towards generating evidence of life on mars. Nora has been studying the photos taken by the curiosity rover from NASA that landed in 2012. Additionally, the structures in Australia could support the claim of life on Mars. NASA supported her claim by suggesting the Giant Gale Crater explored on mars could be potential evidence of microbial life for the past million years.

A article supports the claim made by Noffke. "Sandstone beds of the <3.7 Ga (billion-year-old) Gillespie Lake Member on Mars have been interpreted as evidence of an ancient playa lake environment. On Earth, such environments have been sites of colonization by microbial mats from the early Archean to the present time."   Although it appears as though her research is assumptions and claims that is far from the truth. She has worked on a 24-page article that compares the photos. The photos show sediment deposits resembling the deposits found in modern evaporite located in Portsmouth Island, N.C. and Bahar Alouane, Tunisia (Africa). Her work since 2014 has been to push NASA to collect photography and arrange curiosity missions to study her claims.

Noffke was named a fellow of the American Association for the advancement of Science (AAAS). This award is the equivalent of an Oscar for an actor. The AAAS cited her for her work.

"seminal contributions to the field of geobiology, particularly for elucidation of the previously unrecognized 3.5 billion year fossil record of microbially induced sedimentary structures".Recently, she was elected president of the geological society of Washington, D.C. Publications 
 Geobiology: Microbial Mats in Sandy Deposits from the Archean Era to Today (2010) is a textbook on microbially induced sedimentary structures (MISS): formation, preservation, morphologies, facies associations, texture content.
 Geobiology: Objectives, Concepts, Perspectives (2005)
 Sedimentology: Microbially induced sedimentary structures: a new category within the classification of primary sedimentary structures. (2001) A journal on Sedimentary Research focusing on biotic-physical interactions; erosion, deposition, and deformation of sediments that were influence by major biological components such as Cyanobacterial films and mats.
 Sedimentology: Microbial signatures in peritidal siliciclastic sediments: a catalogue. (2000) A journal listing of microbial structural signatures is provided along with an overview of a number of sedimentary structures from two contemporary siliciclastic peritidal habitats in various climate zones.
 Astrobiology: Microbially Induced Sedimentary Structures Recording an Ancient Ecosystem in the ca. 3.48 Billion-Year-Old Dresser Formation, Pilbara, Western Australia. (2013) Focuses on where Microbially induced sedimentary structures are found and come from. They can be found in a variety of contemporary habitats, such as shelves, tidal flats, lagoons, and more.

Awards and honors 
2007: SEPM James Lee Wilson Award for Excellence in Sedimentary Geology by a Young Scientist
2007: Fellow of the Geological Society of America
2010: Outstanding Contributions to Geobiology, GSA Division for Geobiology
2014: Fellow of the American Association for the Advancement of Science (AAAS)
2020: College of Science Distinguished Teaching Award, Old Dominion University

References 

Living people
Geobiologists
Old Dominion University faculty
University of Tübingen alumni
University of Oldenburg alumni
American women geologists
Year of birth missing (living people)
American women academics
Fellows of the American Association for the Advancement of Science
Fellows of the Geological Society of America
21st-century American women